Offanengo is a comune (municipality) in the Province of Cremona in the Italian region Lombardy, located about  east of Milan and about  northwest of Cremona.

Offanengo borders the following municipalities: Casaletto di Sopra, Crema, Izano, Ricengo, Romanengo.

References

External links
 Official website

Cities and towns in Lombardy